Conservation is an endeavour  including “… the preservation, maintenance, sustainable  use, restoration, and enhancement  of the natural environment”.

Protected Area is “...a  clearly defined geographical space,  recognised, dedicated and managed, through legal or other effective means,  to achieve the long-term conservation of nature with associated ecosystem services and cultural values”. This IUCN definition applies equally to land, inland waters and coastal and marine territories and areas, and is widely considered  to be equivalent to the CBD definition.

Governance is (the process of) “…interactions among structures, processes and traditions that determine how power and responsibilities are exercised, how decisions are taken and how citizens or other stakeholders have their say…”. In less elegant, but possibly clearer words, governance is about taking decisions and ensuring the conditions for their effective implementation. It is the process of developing and exercising authority and responsibility over time. It is about who makes decisions, and how, including in relation to learning processes and evolving institutions in society.

Governance is related to management but different from it. Management is about what is done in pursuit of given objectives. Governance is about who decides about what is to be done, and how those decisions are taken. It is about who holds power, authority and responsibility and who is, or should be, held accountable. Governance is nothing new: someone, somewhere, has always  been taking decisions  about  protected and conserved areas. What is new is that society is now paying  better attention to governance, adding visibility, articulating concepts, and monitoring and evaluating practice. There is no ideal governance setting for protected  or conserved areas, but a set of “good  governance” principles can always be taken into account. Governance is appropriate only when tailored to its specific context and effective in delivering lasting conservation results, livelihood benefits and the respect of rights.

Governance at the IUCN World Parks Congress 

The IUCN World Parks Congress is held once every decade. Since the Congress in Durban (2003), governance has been a recurring stream in the deliberations of the Congress. Governance was also a major stream at the IUCN World Parks Congress 2014. The stream published a primer to develop a basic lexicon in the hope that speaking “a common language” may help to better communicate and develop concepts with increasing clarity and meaning.

Governance Diversity 

Governance diversity for protected and conserved areas is when decisions are made by a variety of actors who enrich and strengthen conservation in practice.  For instance, a national system of protected areas can “enhance governance diversity” by including in the system areas  governed by different types of players and under different arrangements, and/or by providing better recognition and support to conserved territories and areas outside the system.

Four main governance types 

The IUCN and CBD distinguish four broad governance types for protected and conserved areas according to the actors who take or took the fundamental decisions about them (e.g. the actors that “established” them and decided their main purpose and management).
The four main governance types are:
Type A. governance by government (at various levels and possibly combining various agencies)
Type B. governance by various rightsholders and stakeholders together (shared governance)
Type C. governance by private individuals and organizations (usually the landholders)
Type D. governance by indigenous peoples and/or local communities (often referred to as ICCAs)

ICCAs 

ICCAs is an abbreviation that refers to the territories and areas conserved by indigenous peoples and local communities. There are three essential characteristics common to ICCAs:
 an indigenous people or local community possesses a close and  profound  elation with a site (territory, area or habitat)
 the people  or community is the major player in decision-making related to the site and has de facto and/or de jure capacity to develop and enforce regulations
 the people’s or community’s decisions and efforts lead to the conservation of biodiversity, ecological functions and associated cultural values, regardless  of original or primary motivations

Management categories and governance types are independent and can be juxtaposed in the “IUCN Matrix”, visualizing a spectrum of area-based options to conserve nature in a given region/system. The IUCN Matrix can be used to situate protected areas but also conserved territories and areas (the management category, in such case, would not correspond to a key objective but to an observed result).

Conservation depends on well governed systems of protected and conserved areas in the landscape and seascape and systems are made stronger by governance diversity.

Conserved Territories or Areas 
Conserved territories or areas are  “…area-based measure that— regardless of recognition and dedication and at times even regardless of explicit and conscious management practices—  achieve conservation de facto and/or is in a positive conservation trend and likely to maintain this trend in the long term…”.  This definition applies equally to land, inland waters and coastal and marine territories and areas.
The governance types apply to both protected areas and conserved territories and areas that are NOT recognised as “protected” by the IUCN or any specific national  government. In this sense, the terms “Privately Conserved Areas”  and  “ICCAs” encompass extents of land, inland waters and coastal and marine  territories and areas that go beyond  those recognised as “protected” by either national government or the IUCN.

Voluntary and ancillary conservation
Many systems of land and water management support high levels of biodiversity, including critical biodiversity, outside the formal system of protected areas, in sites such as tourism and commercial hunting reserves, private estates or village forests. The term voluntary conservation  captures the idea  that those who exercise governance do so consciously and without restriction, in ways that are fully compatible with conserving biodiversity values while they may or may not see conservation as the primary objective of their management efforts. In other cases, as in military no-go areas or areas abandoned after a natural or man-made disaster, the term ancillary conservation is more appropriate, since conservation is an entirely unintended (though welcome) consequence of management for other purposes.
Conservation in the landscape and seascape is the result of various area-based and non-area-based measures. Among area-based measures we find both protected areas and conserved territories and areas. Crucially, those should be biologically, but also socially, well connected.

Systems of protected and conserved areas
A well-functioning system of  protected  and conserved  areas is complete and well-connected in conserving the representative features and functions of nature in a given environment. Each protected area governance type can also contribute in different ways towards conservation goals, with the complementary and/or overlapping management of conservation features.

Other effective area-based conservation measures (OECMs)

The term “other effective area-based conservation measures”– abbreviated as OECMs—is used by the Convention on Biological Diversity to refer to territories and areas that are effectively conserved but not part of the official protected area system of a given country. In this sense, OECMs can be seen as “clearly defined  geographical space where  de facto conservation of nature  and associated ecosystem services and  cultural values is achieved and expected to be maintained in the long-term regardless of specific recognition and dedication”  (11). OECMs can include the following:
 Primary voluntary conservation that the national government does not wish to recognise as a protected area
 Primary voluntary conservation that refuses the protected area label and/or inclusion in the national  system (e.g. because of self- determination and self-governance issues)
 Secondary voluntary conservation
 Ancillary conservation with a reasonable expectation to be maintained in the long-term
The following Table summarises  various ways of classifying conservation efforts and results:

Governance quality

IUCN principles of good governance for protected  areas
We  speak of governance quality when decisions are made while respecting the “good governance” principles developed through time by a variety of peoples, nations  and UN agencies. A simple and compact formulation of the “IUCN principles of good governance for protected  areas”,  includes:

 Legitimacy and voice— i.e. enjoying broad acceptance and appreciation in society; ensuring procedural rights of access  to information, participation and justice; fostering engagement and  diversity; preventing discrimination; fostering subsidiarity, mutual respect, dialogue, consensus  and agreed rules…
 Direction— i.e. following an inspiring and consistent strategic vision grounded on agreed values and  an appreciation of complexities; ensuring consistency with policy and practice at various levels; ensuring clear answers to contentious questions; ensuring proper adaptive management and favouring the emergence of champions and tested innovations…
 Performance—i.e. achieving conservation and other objectives as planned; promoting a culture of learning; engaging in advocacy and  outreach;  being  responsive to the needs of rightsholders  and stakeholders; ensuring resources and capacities and their efficient use; promoting sustainability and resilience…
 Accountability—i.e. upholding  integrity and commitment; ensuring appropriate access to information and transparency, including for lines of responsibility, allocation of resources, and  evaluation of performances; establishing communication avenues and encouraging feed-back and independent overseeing…
 Fairness and rights—i.e. striving towards equitably shared costs and benefits, without adverse impact for vulnerable people; upholding decency and the dignity of all; being fair, impartial, consistent, non discriminatory, respectful of procedural rights as well as substantive rights, individual and collective human rights, gender equity and the rights of indigenous peoples, including Free, Prior and Informed Consent; promoting local empowerment in conservation.

Given these principals, a “good governance” situation is when decisions are taken legitimately, competently, fairly, and all while respecting rights.

Equitable and effective governance
The IUCN good governance situation can also be summed up as “equitable and effective governance”. The criteria of direction, performance and accountability lead to governance that is effective.

Substantive and procedural rights
Rights are usefully distinguished between substantive and procedural. Procedural rights, such as the rights to information, participation and access to justice, govern the process of determining  and adjudicating substantive rights. In turn, substantive rights refer
to the specific powers  and obligations of individuals and collective bodies under accepted customs and legislation. They span from basic human rights (e.g. life, liberty) to material and financial rights under specific contractual conditions (e.g. access  to a given territory). Procedural  and substantive rights deserve respect in relation to both protected
and conserved areas and territories.

Governance vitality
Governance vitality is when decision-making actors and institutions are functional, responsive, and thriving, meeting their role and responsibilities in timely and appropriate ways. Vitality is expressed by several of these properties.

 Integration and connectivity —i.e. having abundant and  meaningful interactions with diverse actors, sectors and levels of decision-making in society, including those interactions that characterise a system versus scattered  and  isolated single protected  areas, and those interactions that render  decisions effective through the generation of political, social and financial support.
 Adaptability –i.e. being reflexive and flexible, able to accommodate circumstances, integrate knowledge from different cultures, learn from experience and weigh options through dialogue, exchanges, experiment and debate… able to take rapid and meaningful decisions even under challenging circumstances...
 Wisdom —i.e. being aware and respectful of the socio-ecological history and traditional worldviews, knowledge and values of the relevant environment and communities; governing situations of meaningful scope  (e.g. regarding the size and coherence of the units to manage, the number of actors to involve…) and in line with solidarity rather than self-interest only (e.g. sharing benefits, avoiding  accumulation and waste, keeping in mind future generations); not only allowing, but fostering the engagement of as many relevant actors in society as possible…
 Innovation and creativity — i.e. openness to new ideas, ability to re-invent and renew itself as only a living system does, ability to conceive and  implement new solutions, support the emergence of new rules and norms, respond positively to change and continue to develop…
 Empowerment  – i.e. being self-conscious, self-directed, willing and capable of demonstrating leadership, such as by organizing timely responses to emerging environmental conditions, problems and opportunities… but also being self-disciplined and self-critical, able to take on responsibilities in effective and dependable ways…
 
While governance diversity and quality have been explored rather exhaustively, the concept of governance vitality has only recently been identified for further consideration.  All governance properties are open to enrichment and debate.

How does  governance improve?
The IUCN and CBD have recently published a volume of Guidelines for assessing, evaluating and planning for action with a view to improving governance for a system of protected areas or a specific site. In both cases, the methodology begins with an analysis of the historical, socio-cultural, institutional and legal contexts. It then proceeds with a spatial analysis of governance in regards to the status of conservation of nature.  This requires a large, territorial view of the region or area under consideration, including an assessment of biological,  ecological and cultural values and  their potential association with governance diversity, quality and vitality. From that, valuable lessons can be derived and action plans for improvement can be drawn.

Globally, there remains a need to initiate such systematic governance assessments and evaluations processes in a range of contexts, with the aim and expectation that they will catalyze enhanced  diversity, quality and vitality. A structured programme of governance  assessments, supported by learning and capacity development networks is a short and medium term priority to strengthen both conservation policies and results.

See also
 Bennett, A.F., Linkages in the Landscape: The Role of Corridors and Connectivity  in Wildlife Conservation,  IUCN, Gland  (Switzerland)  and  Cambridge (UK), 1999.
 Dearden, P., M. Bennett, J. Johnston, “Trends in Global  Protected  Area Governance 1992-2002”. In: Environmental Management, Volume 36,  July 2005, pp 89–100.
 IUCN WCPA, Transboundary  Conservation:  A systematic  and integrated  approach, Best Practice Protected  Area Guidelines  Series,  Gland, Switzerland, 2014  (forthcoming). 
 Jaireth, H. and  D. Smyth, Innovative Governance, Ane Books, Delhi, 2003.
 Kothari, A., “Protected  areas and  people: the future of the past”,  Parks, 17,  2:23-34, 2006. Stolton, S., K. Redford and  N. Dudley , The Futures of Privately Protected Areas,  Best Practice Protected Area Guidelines  Series Gland, Switzerland, 2014  (forthcoming).
 CBD Secretariat http://www.cbd.int/protected/ 
 ICCA Consortium: http://www.iccaconsortium.org/
 IUCN-Global Protected Area Programme (GPAP) on Governance: www.iucn.org/pa_governance
 UNEP WCMC  protected  area database http://www.protectedplanet.net/

References

Governance
Protected areas